Purumitra is a genus of spiders in the family Uloboridae. It was first described in 1967 by Lehtinen. , it contains 2 species.

References

Uloboridae
Araneomorphae genera
Spiders of Asia
Spiders of Australia
Taxa named by Pekka T. Lehtinen